Volokh may refer to:

 Ilia Volok (Ilia Volokh), Ukrainian actor
 Eugene Volokh, Ukrainian-American legal scholar
 The Volokh Conspiracy, a blog associated with Eugene Volokh

See also 
 Volokhov
 Wallach
 Wallach (disambiguation)
 Oláh (disambiguation)
 Wallachia (disambiguation)
 Vlach, a blanket term covering several modern Latin peoples descending from the Latinised population in Central, Eastern and Southeastern Europe.
 Walhaz, the Germanic root for the word

Ukrainian-language surnames
Surnames of Ukrainian origin
Jewish surnames